Donovan Williams may refer to:
 Donovan Williams (politician)
 Donovan Williams (basketball)